Kim Ha-na (Hangul: 김하나;  or  ; born 27 December 1989) is a South Korean badminton player. She was the mixed doubles gold medalist at the 2013 Asian Championships, and was part of the national team that won the Sudirman Cup in 2017. Kim won her first Superseries title at the 2012 India Open in the women's doubles event. She reached a career high of world no. 1 in the mixed doubles in September 2016.

Sport career 
At the 2012 Summer Olympics,  Kim and her partner Jung Kyung-eun, along with Ha Jung-eun, Kim Min-jung, Wang Xiaoli, Yu Yang, Meiliana Jauhari and Greysia Polii were disqualified from the competition because their efforts were not focused on winning their matches, and their conduct was in a way that was harmful and violent to the sport. They were also accused of trying to lose in order to manipulate the draw.  Kim and her partner Jung Kyung-eun played against China's Wang Xiaoli and Yu Yang.  South Korea filed an appeal to the Badminton World Federation at the Olympics,  but it was rejected.

She competed at the 2014 Asian Games.

She competed at the 2016 Rio Olympics, in the mixed doubles with Ko Sung-hyun.  They were knocked out in the quarterfinals by the Chinese pair of Xu Chen and Ma Jin.

In 2017, she helped the Korean national team compete at the 2017 Sudirman Cup and won that tournament.

Achievements

Asian Championships 
Women's doubles

Mixed doubles

BWF World Tour (1 title) 
The BWF World Tour, which was announced on 19 March 2017 and implemented in 2018, is a series of elite badminton tournaments sanctioned by the Badminton World Federation (BWF). The BWF World Tour is divided into levels of World Tour Finals, Super 1000, Super 750, Super 500, Super 300, and the BWF Tour Super 100.

Mixed doubles

BWF Superseries (6 titles, 8 runners-up) 
The BWF Superseries, launched on 14 December 2006 and implemented in 2007, is a series of elite badminton tournaments, sanctioned by Badminton World Federation (BWF). BWF Superseries has two level such as Superseries and Superseries Premier. A season of Superseries features twelve tournaments around the world, which introduced since 2011, with successful players invited to the Superseries Finals held at the year end.

Women's doubles

Mixed doubles

  BWF Superseries Finals tournament
  BWF Superseries Premier tournament
  BWF Superseries tournament

BWF Grand Prix (11 titles, 7 runners-up) 
The BWF Grand Prix had two levels, the BWF Grand Prix and Grand Prix Gold. It was a series of badminton tournaments sanctioned by the Badminton World Federation (BWF) which was held from 2007 to 2017.

Women's doubles

Mixed doubles

  BWF Grand Prix Gold tournament
  BWF Grand Prix tournament

BWF International Challenge/Series (1 title, 2 runners-up) 
Mixed doubles

  BWF International Challenge tournament
  BWF International Series tournament

References

External links 

 
 Badminton pairs expelled from London 2012 Olympics after 'match-fixing' scandal

1989 births
Living people
Sportspeople from Jeju Province
South Korean female badminton players
Badminton players at the 2012 Summer Olympics
Badminton players at the 2016 Summer Olympics
Olympic badminton players of South Korea
Badminton players at the 2014 Asian Games
Asian Games silver medalists for South Korea
Asian Games medalists in badminton
Medalists at the 2014 Asian Games
World No. 1 badminton players
21st-century South Korean women
20th-century South Korean women